Dashavathara is a 1960 Indian Kannada-language film, directed by P. G. Mohan and produced by B. S. Ranga. The film stars Rajkumar, Udaykumar, Rajashankar and Narasimharaju. The film has musical score by G. K. Venkatesh. This film had its climax scene in Eastmancolor.

Cast

Udaykumar as Kamsa
Rajkumar as Jaya/Hiranyakashipu/Ravana/Shishupala
Rajashankar as Vishnu and his avataras
Narasimharaju as Rahu/Makaranda
K. S. Ashwath
H. R. Shastry as Dharmaraya
Eshwarappa
Veerabhadrappa
H. K. Shastry
A. V. Subba Rao
M. Bhagavathar
Srikanth
Kashinath
Varadaraj
Kuppuraj
Rathnakar
Rajendrakrishna
Ganapathi Bhat
Keshavamurthy
R. Srinivasan
Girimaji
Leelavathi as Mandodari/Droupadi
Advani Lakshmi Devi as Seethe/Rukmini
Rajasree
M. Jayashree
Saroja
B. Jaya
Papamma as Shabari
Baby Suma
Lakshmikantham
Mala

Soundtrack
The music was composed by G. K. Venkatesh.

References

1960 films
1960s Kannada-language films
Films scored by G. K. Venkatesh
Hindu mythological films
Films based on the Bhagavata Purana